Vojin Ćetković (born 22 August 1971) is a Serbian actor. He is best known for his role in the TV series Porodično blago.

Selected filmography

Television

Film

Personal life
He is married to Sloboda Mićalović, a Serbian actress. They have two daughters, Mila and Vera. He is the godfather of two of actor Nebojša Glogovac's sons.

References

External links

 

1971 births
Living people
Serbian male actors
Actors from Kruševac
Miloš Žutić Award winners
Dr. Branivoj Đorđević Award winners